Chehel Amiran (also Romanized as Chehel Amīrān; also known as Chahlamīzan and Chehlān Mīzān) is a village in Babarashani Rural District, Chang Almas District, Bijar County, Kurdistan Province, Iran. In 2006, its population was 120, in 27 families. The village is populated by Kurds.

References 

Towns and villages in Bijar County
Kurdish settlements in Kurdistan Province